Fighting Luck is a 1925 American silent western film directed by J.P. McGowan and starring Bob Reeves, Ione Reed and Lew Meehan.

Cast
 Bob Reeves as 	Tiger Slauson
 Ione Reed as Texas Houston
 William Ryno as 	Silver Houston 
 Lew Meehan as 	Dude Slade (The Coyote)
 Eddie Barry as 	Cousin Oswald aka Wilkdcat
 J.P. McGowan as Gang Leader

References

Bibliography
 Munden, Kenneth White. The American Film Institute Catalog of Motion Pictures Produced in the United States, Part 1. University of California Press, 1997.

External links

1925 films
1925 Western (genre) films
1920s American films
Silent American Western (genre) films
Films directed by J. P. McGowan
American silent feature films
1920s English-language films
Rayart Pictures films